The 99th Range Group  is an inactive United States Air Force (USAF) unit.  It was last stationed at Nellis AFB, Nevada, where it was responsible for the Nevada Test and Training Range (NTTR).

1945 RBS unit
After the Colorado Springs Tent Camp gained the 1946 Fifteenth Air Force headquarters for bomber operations, including Radar Bomb Scoring (RBS), "Colorado Springs" had the 206th Army Air Force Base Unit (RBS) organized on 6 June 1945 and which initially controlled RBS detachments at Kansas City and Fort Worth Army Airfield.  From August to 8 March 1946, as the 63rd AAFBU, the headquarters was at Mitchel Field on Long Island, New York, and after returning to Colorado Springs, was renamed the 263rd AAFBU.  The 263rd, after transferring from 15th AF to directly under Strategic Air Command, was redesignated the 3903rd Radar Bomb Scoring Squadron (SAC) effective on 1 August 1948 and by 25 August 1949, the 3903rd RBSS controlled the nearby "Denver Bomb Plot" RBS detachment.

1951 RBS group
The 15th AF HQ departed the 1949 Ent Air Force Base for March AFB and the 3903rd went  to Carswell AFB and became a group in 1951.  The 1st Radar Bomb Scoring Group was activated in 1954 and assumed the 3903d Radar Bomb Scoring Group mission.

1961 division

On 1 August 1961 the 3908th Strategic Standardization Group that provided command level standardization/evaluation of SAC aircrews merged with the 1st Radar Bomb Scoring Group, with the 1CEVG Radar Bomb Scoring Division acquiring the previous RBS Group's personnel, electronic equipment, and mission.  1CEVG RBS personnel managed Combat Skyspot operations during the Vietnam War.

1989 range group
The personnel and the assets of the Radar Bomb Scoring Division became the 1st Electronic Combat Range Group on 1 July 1989 when the 1CEVG was split, and other 1CEVG organizations transferred to SAC headquarters. 1 CEVG/Det. 2 was moved from Wall, SD to Holbrook, AZ in 1968. We were up and running around the middle of April. …1990 when we became 99 ECRG/DET 2. The last RBS/ECM sortie was on or about September 13, 1993. The last ECM-only sortie was on or about September 30, 1993. A Rockwell B-1B from Dyess (not positive) flew the last RBS/ECM mission. A C-130 from Hulburt Field flew the last ECM mission. The period of time between October 1, 1993, and Christmas was used for decommissioning the systems"

The 1st ECRG then became the 99th Electronic Combat Range Group in 1992 when USAF required subordinate groups to carry the same number as their parent wings.  In 1995 it moved to Nellis and changed its mission to management of the NTTR.  In October 1995, the group moved to Nellis AFB, Nevada and was redesignated the 99th Range Group.  There it assumed the mission of managing the Nevada Test and Training Range. To perform this mission it was assigned two subordinate squadrons, the 99th Range Squadron and 99th Range Support Squadron.  It continued this task until its mission was transferred to its parent, the 99th Air Base Wing.

Lineage
 Constituted as the 1st Radar Bomb Scoring Group on 9 June 1954. 
 Activated on 10 Aug 1954. 
 Redesignated as: 1 Combat Evaluation Group on 1 Aug 1961; 
                 : 1 Electronic Combat Range Group on 1 Jul 1989; 
                 : 99 Electronic Combat Range Group on 1 Aug 1992; 
                 : 99 Range Group on 1 Oct 1995. Inactivated on 7 Feb 2000.

Assignments
 Strategic Air Command, 10 Aug 1954;  
 99th Strategic Weapons Wing (later 99th Tactics and Training Wing, 99th Wing, 99th Air Base Wing), 10 August 1989 - 7 February 2000

Subordinate Units
 99th Range Squadron, 1 October 1995 - 7 February 2000
 99th Range Support Squadron, 1 October 1995 - 7 February 2000

Flight
 10th SHORAN Beacon Flight, 10 August 1954 - 25 July 1966

Stations
 Nellis AFB, Nevada, 1 October 1995 - 7 February 2000

References

Groups of the United States Air Force
Military units and formations established in 1954